Jakob Tånnander (born 10 August 2000) is a Swedish footballer who plays as a goalkeeper for Allsvenskan club IK Sirius.

Club career
He signed a contract with HJK for the 2022 season on 19 January 2022.
Since 2023 he plays for Swedish club IK Sirius.

Career statistics

Club

Notes

References

2000 births
Living people
People from Lund Municipality
Swedish footballers
Sweden youth international footballers
Association football goalkeepers
Ettan Fotboll players
Kakkonen players
Veikkausliiga players
Lunds BK players
Malmö FF players
Helsingin Jalkapalloklubi players
Klubi 04 players
FC Haka players
Swedish expatriate footballers
Expatriate footballers in Finland
Swedish expatriate sportspeople in Finland
Footballers from Skåne County